Prosopocoilus giraffa, the giraffe stag beetle, is the world's largest stag beetle and is a member of the family Lucanidae within the order Coleoptera. They have  very long, toothed and notched mandibles that protrude about half the size of their body. They tend to be aggressive and are fierce and powerful. Males fight each other using these strong and enlarged jaws to lift and throw rivals to win a mate. They can grow up to 119 millimetres in length. Several distinctive populations (subspecies) are found in moist forested region areas of Asia, ranging from India to Indonesia.  Prosopocoilus giraffa keisukei can measure up to 12 centimeters. Prosopocoilus giraffa daisukei have the brightest elytra of all subspecies and Prosopocoilus giraffa giraffa is the smallest subspecies.

List of subspecies
 Prosopocoilus giraffa borobudur  (Sumatra, Java and Bali Is.)
 Prosopocoilus giraffa daisukei  (Negros and Sibuyan Is.)
 Prosopocoilus giraffa giraffa  (Malaysia, Thailand, Vietnam, Nepal, Myanmar, Laos, Bhutan, Cambodia and India)
 Prosopocoilus giraffa keisukei  (Flores Is., Lombok Is.)
 Prosopocoilus giraffa makatai  (Philippines - Mindoro, Luzon)
 Prosopocoilus giraffa nilgiriensis  (S. India)
 Prosopocoilus giraffa nishikawai  (Sangir Is.)
 Prosopocoilus giraffa nishiyamai  (Sulawesi)
 Prosopocoilus giraffa timorensis  (Timor Is.)

References

External links

Giraffe stag beetle photos.

Lucaninae
Beetles of Asia
Prosopocoilus
Beetles described in 1789